This is a list of ships sunk by missiles. Ships have been sunk by unguided projectiles for many centuries, but the introduction of guided missiles during World War II changed the dynamics of naval warfare. 1943 saw the first ships to be sunk by guided weapons, launched from aircraft, although it was not until 1967 that a ship was sunk by a missile launched from a ship outside a test environment. Both of these were warships, but missiles have also attacked merchant ships.  More than fifty other vessels have been sunk, in war and in peace.

This list only contains vessels sunk by guided missiles, and does not include those destroyed by unguided weapons such as naval artillery, torpedoes or crewed weapons like the Kamikaze MXY-7 Ohka suicide rocket. It also does not include vessels that were crippled and subsequently broken up.

Background

Ships have been equipped to fire projectiles for centuries, particularly the use of trebuchet and, ultimately, cannon developed by the Song dynasty, the latter epitomising naval weaponry in the Age of Sail. However, the use of guided weapons did not emerge until the Second World War, when guided bombs, a form of precision-guided munition, started being developed by both the Allies and Axis. The first to be used operationally was a German weapon, the Fritz X. Initial attacks were unsuccessful, but on 9 September 1943, Fritz X damaged the Italian battleship Italia and sank the battleship , the first successful strike by a guided missile against a capital ship. At the same time, the Henschel Hs 293 entered service, equipped with a rocket engine. First used in combat in 1943, these were the first guided missiles to sink a warship.

After the war, development of anti-ship missiles continued, particularly in the Soviet Union and Sweden, who saw mounting missiles on ships as a way to increase the strike capacity of small vessels. It was a Soviet missile, the  P-15 Termit, that made this public and sunk a ship in combat on 21 October 1967, launched from a vessel of the Egyptian Navy. This demonstration led to a proliferation of other missiles being developed, including the Exocet. The Exocet was used extensively during the Iran–Iraq War, particularly during the Tanker War, where it was the primary missile used by Iraqi Air Force. In addition to nations, anti-ship missiles are also used by non-state actors who target merchant vessels, using missiles in a form of piracy.

To counter anti-ship missiles, warships have used surface-to-air missiles, advanced electronic countermeasures and close-in weapons systems.

List
The list includes all verified sinkings.

Notes

References

Citations

Bibliography

 
 
 
 
 
 
 
 
 

 
 
 
 
 

 
 
 
 
 
 
 
 
 
 
 
 
 
 

Anti-ship missiles
Missiles
Naval history
Naval warfare